Zarabod is a small agricultural hamlet in Gojal (Upper Hunza) in Gilgit-Baltistan, Pakistan. The people of Passu and Husseini have equally divided it into two parts. Zarabad is a combination of the Persian words "Zar" and "Abod"; Zar means gold and Abod means cultivated land.

Populated places in Gilgit District